Double hour may refer to:

Double hour (unit), a traditional Chinese unit of time also known as a Watch
The Double Hour, a 2009 Italian film